The Lion The Beast The Beat is the fourth studio album by American rock band Grace Potter and the Nocturnals, released on June 12, 2012. The album debuted at 17 on Billboard's Top 200 Album chart, selling 24,000 units in its opening week.  The album has sold 159,000 copies in the US as of June 2015.

Reception
Metacritic, a website which assigns television, music, and film an average score based on several reviews, gave the album a 70 out of 100, indicating positive reviews. Review website Consequence of Sound stated that "Potter's vocals are gorgeous as always, but the overall tone of the Nocturnals has arguably changed — forgoing country for experimental rock, they’ve also successfully woven electronic influences into the mix". The New York Times said that The Lion The Beast The Beat is "the fourth, and by far best, studio album by this band". AllMusic, whilst calling the album overall a "creative leap" and Potter's melodies "solid", considered some of her lyric choices "...a bit clunky" and added that the band compensated with "passion, execution, and smart production choices and arrangements".

Mickey Woods of Glamour magazine considered the album a mixed result, commenting "which I believe to be intentional". He also called the album "frenzied and scattered, but incredibly dynamic", complimenting the instruments and Potter's "totally electric" voice and compared her voice to Jefferson Airplane. Review website PopMatters also gave the album a positive review, noting that Potter has the "vocal arsenal of a Greek God—part Joplin, part Boudica, all lethal weapon" and calling the album a "mischievously devilish quandary". PremierGuitar.com also gave the album a positive review, complimenting several of the songs including the title track and the album a "collection of highly inspired songs to deliver a full range of foot-stompers, piercing hooks, and driving melody".

Track listing
All tracks are written by Grace Potter, except where noted.

Charts

Personnel
Adapted credits from the booklet.

The Nocturnals
Grace Potter – vocals (all tracks), guitar (1, 11, 13), tambourine (1, 3, 4, 8, 11), keyboards (2-8, 13), Wurlitzer (6), Mellotron (2), synth bass (7), Hammond organ (1, 3, 9, 10, 14, 15), pipe organ (1), percussion (7), clock (5), drums (13)
Scott Tournet – guitars (1-14), Echoplex (1, 7), keyboards (2, 5), bass guitar (6), lap steel guitar (3, 4), vocals (3, 6, 9, 11), loops (4), noise (5, 8), ambience (4, 10), drums (13)
Benny Yurco – guitars (1-7, 10, 11, 13), synth bass (1), vocals (3, 6, 7, 11), sitar (6), Echoplex (3, 7), bass guitar (8, 9, 12, 13), ambience (10), noise (5, 11), drums (13)
Matt Burr – drums (1-13), tambourine (1), vocals (3, 6, 7, 9, 11), percussion (7, 8, 13), trash cans (8), shaker (9)
Michael Libramento – drums (1, 12), bass guitar (1, 2, 4, 5, 11), agogô bells (2), vocals (3, 9, 11), keyboards (9), tambourine (1, 9, 13), Moog bass (10)

Additional personnel
Dan Auerbach – Casio drum loop (2), vocals & handclaps (6), producer
Jim Scott – percussion (3), cowbell (12)
David Campbell – string arrangements (1, 4, 10, 11)
Geoffrey Weiss – claves (13)
Larry Franklin – fiddle (14)
Willie Nelson – vocals, gut-string guitar and trigger (15)
Mickey Raphael – harmonica (15) 
John Barlow Jarvis – piano (14, 15)
Kenny Greenberg – electric guitar (14, 15)
Michael Rhodes – bass guitar (14, 15)
Pat Buchanan – electric guitar (14, 15)
Dan Dugmore – steel guitar (14, 15)
Chad Cromwell – drums (14, 15)
Kenny Chesney – backing vocals (14) 
Alison Krauss – backing vocals (14)

References

2012 albums
Grace Potter and the Nocturnals albums
Hollywood Records albums
Albums produced by Dan Auerbach
Albums produced by Jim Scott (producer)
Experimental rock albums by American artists
Funk rock albums by American artists